Dhanvanthi, Lady Rama Rau (1893–1987) was founder and president of the Family Planning Association of India and the International Planned Parenthood Federation. She was married to Sir Benegal Rama Rau, the noted civil servant, and was the mother of Santha Rama Rau, the writer.

Early life
Dhanvanthi was born into a Kashmir Brahmin family as Dhanvanthi Handoo, born and brought up in Hubli (now in Karnataka) and was therefore conversant with Kannada. After schooling in Hubli, she moved to Madras to join the Presidency College, from where she graduated with a bachelor's degree in arts, and was awarded the Griggs Gold Medal in English.

In Madras, she met and married the distinguished economist and diplomat Sir Benegal Rama Rau a Chitrapur Saraswat Brahmin and a south Indian from a distinguished family.

Career
She started her career as an Assistant Professor at Queen Mary’s College, Madras.

In 1917, she co-founded the Women's Indian Association along with Annie Besant, Margaret Cousins, Jeena Raja Dasa, and others to liberate women from the deplorable condition women suffered in socio-economic and political matters during the 19th and the early 20th century.

In 1932, she attended the International Alliance of Women for Suffrage and Equal Citizenship in Berlin, leading the Indian delegation at the behest of Sarojini Naidu.

In 1946, she was elected president of the All India Women's Conference.

In 1949, she started the Family Planning Association of India.

In 1952, Dhanvanthi co-founded and served as the joint president of the International Planned Parenthood Federation, along with Margaret Sanger.

Awards
 Kaisir-i-Hind gold medal by the British Government for her work with women’s associations.
 Padma Bhushan by the Indian Government in 1959.

Bibliography
Her memoirs have been published under the title An Inheritance.

References

1893 births
1987 deaths
Kashmiri people
Recipients of the Padma Bhushan in social work
People from Hubli
20th-century Indian educational theorists
Social workers
Educators from Karnataka
Women educators from Karnataka
Social workers from Karnataka
Wives of knights
20th-century women educators
20th-century Indian women